John Henry Kirwan (9 February 1878 – 9 January 1959) was an Irish football player and coach. As a player, he was described as an out and out winger with good pace and skills, playing as an outside-left for, among others, Everton, Tottenham Hotspur, Chelsea and Ireland. He had previously played Gaelic football for Dublin. As a football coach he became the first professional manager of Dutch side Ajax. He was the last survivor of the Tottenham team that won the 1901 FA Cup.

Playing career

Early years
Kirwan initially played Gaelic football for the Dublin county team and won an All-Ireland medal with Dublin in 1894 when they defeated Cork by 1–2 to 0–5 after a replay. Although both the final and the replay finished level, Dublin were awarded the cup. He then played soccer joined Southport Central of the Lancashire League where he attracted the attentions of both Everton and Blackburn Rovers. He opted to sign for Everton in July 1898 and was subsequently used to replace John Cameron who had been sold to Tottenham Hotspur. He made his league debut for Everton against Preston N.E. in September 1898. During his one season at the club he made 24 league appearances and scored 5 goals. He also played a further 2 games in the FA Cup. While at Everton his teammates included among others Samuel Wolstenholme.

Tottenham Hotspur
After just one season at Everton, Kirwan followed John Cameron to Tottenham Hotspur where the latter was now manager. During his six seasons at Tottenham, he played alongside John Brearley and Vivian Woodward. Kirwan scored 97 goals in 347 games for the club. This included 23 in games in the FA Cup. He also helped the club win the Southern League in 1900 and the FA Cup in 1901. This saw Tottenham become the only club outside the English League to win the competition. Kirwan kept the ball used in the final until he died in 1959. In 1900 Kirwan also became the first Spurs player capped by Ireland.

Later years
In May 1905 Kirwan left Tottenham Hotspur and joined Chelsea. He made 76 appearances in total for Chelsea and scored 16 goals. In 1907 he helped Chelsea finish runners up in the Second Division and thus gain promotion. Kirwan also played 3 games for Chelsea in the FA Cup, scoring 1 goal. After leaving Chelsea he played for Clyde and Leyton F.C. before retiring as a player.

Irish international
Between 1900 and 1909 Kirwan played 17 times for Ireland. He made his international debut on 24 February 1900 in a 2–0 away defeat to Wales. Kirwan, together with Archie Goodall, Billy Scott, Billy McCracken and Robert Milne, was a member of the Ireland team that clinched a share in the 1903 British Home Championship. Until then the competition had been monopolised by England and Scotland. However, in 1903, before goal difference was applied, Ireland forced a three way share. Despite losing their opening game 4–0 to England, the Irish then beat Scotland for the first time on 21 March 1903. Kirwan scored his first goal for Ireland in the 2–0 win at Celtic Park. He then helped Ireland beat Wales 2–0 in the final game of the tournament. He scored his second goal for Ireland in a 3–1 defeat to England on 12 March 1904. His final game for Ireland was a 5–0 defeat to Scotland on 15 March 1909.

Coaching career
In September 1910 Kirwan moved to the Netherlands where he became the first professional manager at Ajax Amsterdam. In 1911 he led Ajax to the Dutch Second Class title and victory in a promotion play-off, thus guiding the club into the Dutch top flight for the first time. Kirwan returned to London after the outbreak of the First World War and was succeeded as Ajax coach by Jack Reynolds. Kirwan later coached Bohemians in his native country and A.S. Livorno in Italy for one season before settling in the London area.

Additional information
John Kirwan was survived by his widow Edith who died in 1976, and daughters Eileen who died aged 101 in 2014 and Maureen who died aged 94 in 2009. Many of his international caps and shirts are still in the family, although a lot of his more historical possessions were given to the Tottenham Hotspur museum including the 1901 FA Cup Ball.

Career statistics

International

Ireland score listed first, score column indicates score after each Kirwan goal

Honours

As a Gaelic footballer 
Dublin
All-Ireland Senior Football Championship: 1894

As a soccer player 
Tottenham Hotspur

FA Cup: 1900–01
Southern League: 1899–1900, runner up: 1901–02, 1903–04
Western League: 1903–04
Sheriff of London Charity Shield: 1902

Ireland
British Home Championship: 1903 (shared)

References

Sources
Tony Matthews, Who's Who of Everton (2004)
''Bohemian F.C. Match Programme Vol. 41, No. 1

External links
Northern Ireland’s Footballing Greats
Tottenham stats
Cited as early Ajax manager

1878 births
1959 deaths
Association footballers from County Wicklow
Dublin inter-county Gaelic footballers
Gaelic footballers who switched code
Irish association footballers (before 1923)
Pre-1950 IFA international footballers
Everton F.C. players
Tottenham Hotspur F.C. players
Chelsea F.C. players
Clyde F.C. players
English Football League players
Southern Football League players
Irish association football managers
Irish expatriate association football managers
AFC Ajax managers
Wicklow Gaelic footballers
Association football forwards
FA Cup Final players
Irish expatriate sportspeople in Italy
Expatriate football managers in Italy
Irish expatriate sportspeople in the Netherlands
Expatriate football managers in the Netherlands